Saint-Bouize is a commune in the Cher department in central France.

Population

Sights
 Chateau Lagrange-Montalivet, 1590.
 Church St. Baudel (twelfth century for its oldest parts): Built in four stages, ... The base is a Romanesque church Berry "pure", consisting of two rectangles built in the twelfth century. In the fourteenth century, a tower is erected by the Count of Sancerre, at the request of parishioners. At the heart of religious wars, the tower is suffering: it was twice as high in the beginning. In the eighteenth century a sacristy was built in 1836 and a chapel. In 1850, the priest asks its demolition for a more modern building, which will be rejected [2].
 Bridge-channel mold which allows the lateral canal to cross the Loire River Moule, 1893.

Geography
The river Vauvise flows north through the middle of the commune.
The Château de Montalivet-Lagrange is here.

See also
Communes of the Cher department

References

Communes of Cher (department)